Maksis Kazāks (10 May 1912 – 19 June 1983) was a Latvian basketball player. He competed in the men's tournament at the 1936 Summer Olympics. He also participated in EuroBasket 1939, where Latvia won the silver medal.

References

1912 births
1983 deaths
Latvian men's basketball players
Olympic basketball players of Latvia
Basketball players at the 1936 Summer Olympics
Basketball players from Riga